An octuple scull (abbreviated 8X) is a racing shell or a rowing boat used in the sport of rowing. The octuple is directed by a coxswain and propelled by eight rowers who move the boat by sculling with two oars, one in each hand. Unlike other boats, octuples are seldom seen at higher levels of competitive rowing, usually only being used for those who are newer to the sport. This is because of the high speed of the boat, which can cause greater injury to the ribcage if one lets go of their oar during a race.

Racing boats (often called "shells") are long, narrow, and broadly semi-circular in cross-section in order to reduce drag to a minimum. They usually have a fin towards the rear, to help prevent roll and yaw. Originally made from wood, shells are now almost always made from a composite material (usually carbon-fibre reinforced plastic) for strength and weight advantages. The riggers in sculling apply the forces symmetrically to each side of the boat.

When there are eight rowers in a boat, each with only one sweep oar and rowing on opposite sides, the combination is referred to as a  "coxed eight." In sweep oared racing the rigging means the forces are staggered alternately along the boat.

Notes

References

External links

Rowing racing boats